= Wakefield Reef =

Reef in off Heard Island

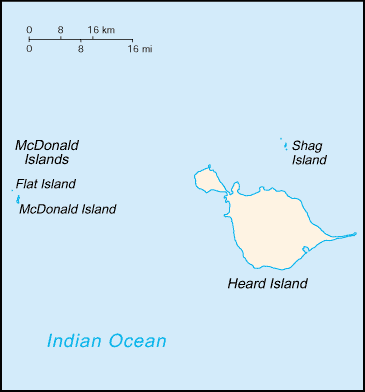

Wakefield Reef (53°11′S 73°21′E) is a reef, 0.5 nautical miles (0.9 km) across, lying 2.5 nautical miles (4.6 km) west-southwest of Cape Arkona, off the southwest side of Heard Island. The existence of a reef in this area is noted on an unpublished American sealer's map of "Hurds Island" compiled during the 1860-70 period, although the configuration of this side of the island is somewhat distorted, as were all early maps of the island. The feature was more accurately charted and named by HMS Wakefield which visited the island in April 1910.
